"The Rockford Files" is a 1975 instrumental by Mike Post and co-composer Pete Carpenter.  The song is the theme from the TV series The Rockford Files starring James Garner. It appears at the opening and ending of each episode with different arrangements. Throughout the show's tenure, the theme song went through numerous evolutions, with later versions containing a distinct electric guitar bridge section played by session guitarist Dan Ferguson.

The Instrumental features a blues harmonica solo, dobro guitar, an electric guitar solo heard in the bridges, plus a Minimoog synthesizer, heard in the refrains.  This was one of the first popular song appearances for the synthesizer.

The song spent four months on the charts and in August 1975 became a Top 10 hit in the U.S. (#10, for two weeks)  and in Canada (#8).  It was also a Top 20 Adult Contemporary hit in both nations. 

"The Rockford Files" won a 1975 Grammy Award for Best Instrumental Arrangement.

The B-side track (or "flip-side") entitled "Dixie Lullabye" was also composed by Post and Carpenter.
"The Rockford Files" is also the music football team Tranmere Rovers run out to.

Personnel
 Lead guitar, dobro — Dan Ferguson
 Guitar — Stephen Geyer
 Bass — Lyle Ritz
 Minimoog synthesizer — Mike Post
 Harmonica — Tommy Morgan
 Banjo — Herb Pedersen
 Drums — Jim Gordon
 Percussion — Gary Coleman

Chart history

Weekly charts

Year-end charts

References

External links
  

1975 songs
MGM Records singles
Television drama theme songs
Song recordings produced by Mike Post
1970s instrumentals
The Rockford Files